Kent Klich (born 1952) is a Swedish photographer living in Copenhagen.

Life and work
Klich studied psychology at the University of Gothenburg and worked with adolescent children before turning to photography. He joined Magnum Photos in 1998 and left in 2002.  His work is noted for a strong commitment to social issues and has worked with street children in Mexico and drug addicts in Denmark. In 2001 he collaborated with the author Herta Müller on a project and book Children of Ceausescu detailing the HIV crisis among Romanian children.

Solo exhibitions
1998: Street children, Mexico, Stockholm City Museum, Stockholm, Sweden, 1999;  Center for Photography, Copenhagen, Denmark, 1999; Wermlands Museum, Sweden, 1999; Center for Photography, Örebro, Sweden, 2000; Dunya Kitabevi, Istanbul, Turkey, 2000; City Hall, Sundsvall, Sweden, 2001.
2001: Children of Ceausescu, The Swedish Cultural Institute, Paris, 2001; The Photo Museum, Sundsvall, Sweden, 2007; Tensta Konsthall,  Stockholm. 2010.
2001: Work in progress, Beth, Fotografevi, Istanbul, Turkey.
2004: "El niño" (Kaunas Photo Days 2004: Nordic Image), Kaunas House of Jesuits, Kaunas, Lithuania.
2006: A Family Story / Picture Imperfect, Nikolaj Copenhagen Contemporary Art Center, Denmark; Museum of Work, Norrköping, Sweden, 2006.
2007: A Family Story, Kunsthallen Brænderigården, Viborg, Denmark. 
2008: Out of Sight Out of Mind, exhibition on the streets in the city of Copenhagen / The Danish Architecture Center, Denmark; Museum of Malmö, Sweden, 2008.
2009: Mexico/Out of sight, Landskrona, Sweden.
2009: Gaza: Boningar, Tegen 2, Stockholm.
2010: Gaza Photo Album, Umbrage Gallery, New York; Hasselblad Center, Gothenburg, Sweden, 2010.
2012: Killing time, Tegen2, Stockholm.
2013: Ceausescus barn, Malmö Museer, Malmö, Sweden.

Publications
The book of Beth
Beths bok. [Oslo]: Oktober, 1988. . 
Beths bok. Stockholm: Norstedts, 1988. . 
Beths bog. Copenhagen: Tiderne skifter, 1988. . 
The book of Beth. New York: Aperture, 1989. . 
El Niño, text by Elena Poniatowska
El Niño: En berättelse om gatubarn i Mexico City. Stockholm: Journal, 1999. . 
El Niño: En beretning om gadebørn i Mexico City. Copenhagen: Tiderne Skifter, 1999. . 
El Niño, Children of the streets, Mexico City = El Niño: Niños de la calle, Ciudad de México. Syracuse: Syracuse University Press, 1999. . 
Children of Ceausescu, foreword by Herta Müller
Ceausescus barn. Stockholm: Journal, 2001. . 
Children of Ceausescu. New York: Umbrage, 2001. ; . 
Historien om et menneske: Eller når to plus to bliver fem. Copenhagen: Kunsthallen Nikolaj, 2006. . Text by Mette Sandbye. 
Picture imperfect / Beth R. (book and DVD). With Kim Fupz Aakeson.
Picture imperfect. Stockholm: Journal, 2007. . 
Beth R. Copenhagen: Politisk Revy, 2008. . 
Out of sight. Stockholm: Journal, 2008. Published together with Dogwalk by Tina Enghoff. Text by Carole Naggar. ; .  
Gaza photo album 
Gaza photo album. Stockholm: Journal, 2009. . 
Gaza photo album. Copenhagen: Politisk Revy, 2009. . 
Gaza photo album. New York: Umbrage, 2010. . 
Världens mitt finns inte påkartan. Stockholm: Mormor, 2009. . Text by Göran Odbratt. 
Where I am now. Little Journey no. 7. Munich: Bellyband, 2012. .
Gaza Works. Berlin: Koenig, 2017. .

Prizes and awards
2002 Prize, the Museum of Work’s documentary photography prize, Norrköping, Sweden.
2003 Prize, the city of Västerås, Sweden.
2003 Grant, Hasselblad Foundation, Gothenburg, Sweden.
2003 Grant, Sveriges Författarfond, Stockholm, Sweden.
2004 Grant, Sveriges Författarfond, Stockholm, Sweden.
2005 Prize, Fogtdals Forlag, Copenhagen, Denmark.
2006 5-year grant, the Arts Grants Committee, Stockholm, Sweden.
2006 Special mention, Beths dagbog (Beth's Diary), 17th Nordisk Panorama Film Festival, Århus, Denmark.
2006 GuldDok for Best Short Film in Copenhagen Denmark, Beths dagbog (Beth's Diary).
2008 ”Fotofrühling” The Kassel Fotoforum, Picture Imperfect among the 22 best photobooks of 2007/08.
2009 Picture Imperfect winner of The Swedish Photo Book Prize
2010 First prize, General News Singles, World Press Photo awards (for a photograph of Gaza City)
2017: Special Mention for Author's Book Award, Rencontres d'Arles Book Award, for Gaza Works.

References

External links
 Klich's website
 About El Niño, PixelPress
Interview with Klich about Gaza Photo Album, foto8.com
Judith Butler with Kent Klich, "Dispossess: Kent Klich's Images of Vacated Life in Gaza after 2008", Columbia University Graduate School of Architecture, Planning and Preservation, 20 February 2013. With video.
Jeffrey Ladd, The Book of Beth and Picture Imperfect by Kent Klich, 5B4
Mats Granberg, "Den senaste berättelsen om Beth", Norrköpings Tidningar, 1 September 2006.

Swedish photographers

University of Gothenburg alumni
Living people
1952 births